WNAV (1430 AM) is a radio station located in Annapolis, Maryland. It first went on the air on April 22, 1949, from studios at 89 West Street in Annapolis. Its first president and general manager was Albert H. MacCarthy.  The full-service outlet still broadcasts at 1430 kilohertz, its original location on the AM dial.

Owner Pat Sajak, the host of Wheel of Fortune, reached a deal to sell the station to local investors in October 2021.  In December, the new management informed on-air staff that they would be let go at the end of the month.

WNAV also uses an FM translator, W260BM, that broadcasts at 99.9 MHz.

While primarily a locally originated station, syndicated programming heard on WNAV includes First Light.  The station also airs the hourly CBS News Radio and is the flagship station for the United States Naval Academy's: Men's and Women's Lacrosse and Basketball teams, as well as the school's Baseball team.  The station is also a broadcast affiliate for both the Baltimore Orioles baseball and Baltimore Ravens football teams.

WNAV's weekly public affairs shows are the "1430 Connection," "Talk With" and the "Volunteer Voice." "The Boat Show" is a sponsored program that also airs weekly.

Awards received by WNAV and its staff members include:

 Outstanding News Operation,  Chesapeake Associated Press Broadcasters Association, 2015

 Best Reporter (Finn Neilsen), Chesapeake Associated Press Broadcasters Association, 2015

 Outstanding Talk Show (Donna Cole for the 1430 Connection), Chesapeake Associated Press Broadcasters Association, 2015

 Multimedia/Online Journalism (Finn Neilsen), Chesapeake Associated Press Broadcasters Association, 2015

 Outstanding Public Affairs Show (Donna Cole for the 1430 Connection),Chesapeake Associated Press Broadcasters Association, 2016

 Multimedia/Online Journalism (Emil Gallina), Chesapeake Associated Press Broadcasters Association, 2016

 Outstanding Year-Round Local Sports (Wiley Baker), Chesapeake Associated Press Broadcasters Association, 2016

 Outstanding News Operation, Chesapeake Associated Press Broadcasters Association, 2016

 Outstanding Public Affairs Show (Jane Schlegel for Talk With), Chesapeake Associated Press Broadcasters Association, 2017

 Best Reporter (Jane Schlegel), Chesapeake Associated Press Broadcasters Association, 2017

 Baltimore Touchdown Club's Hall of Fame Media Person of the Year (Wiley Baker), 2018

 Outstanding News Operation, Chesapeake Associated Press Broadcasters Association, 2018

 Outstanding Digital Feature Project (Donna Cole), Chesapeake Associated Press Broadcasters Association, 2018

 Outstanding Digital News Project (Donna Cole), Chesapeake Associated Press Broadcasters Association, 2018

 Multimedia/Online Journalism (Donna Cole), Chesapeake Associated Press Broadcasters Association, 2018

 Outstanding Enterprise Reporting (Donna Cole for A Banned Pesticide Killed 18 Bald Eagles), Chesapeake Associated Press Broadcasters Association, 2018

 Outstanding Spot News Reporting (Jane Schlegel and Brandon Simpson for Capital Gazette Shootings), Chesapeake Associated Press Broadcasters Association, 2018

 Outstanding Year-Round Local Sports (Wiley Baker),Chesapeake Associated Press Broadcasters Association, 2018

 Dateline Award for Excellence in Local Journalism for Investigative Journalism (Donna Cole for What Killed the Bald Eagles), Society of Professional Journalists Washington, D.C. Pro Chapter, 2019

WNAV celebrated its 70 anniversary in July 2019.

Translator
In addition to the main station, WNAV is relayed by one FM translator to alleviate difficulty with AM reception in cities.

References

External links

NAV
News and talk radio stations in the United States
Full service radio stations in the United States